Minh Hải was a province on Mekong Delta in southern Vietnam. Minh Hải was established in February 1976 from An Xuyên province and part of Bạc Liêu province. On November 6, 1996, it was split into Bạc Liêu province and Cà Mau province.

References 
 Provinces of Vietnam at statoids.com

Former provinces of Vietnam
Mekong Delta